Benjamin Lloyd Crump (born October 10, 1969) is an American attorney who specializes in civil rights and catastrophic personal injury cases such as wrongful death lawsuits. His practice has focused on cases such as Trayvon Martin, Michael Brown, George Floyd, Keenan Anderson and Tyre Nichols, people affected by the Flint water crisis, and the plaintiffs behind the 2019 Johnson & Johnson baby powder lawsuit alleging the company's talcum powder product led to ovarian cancer diagnoses. Crump is also founder of the firm Ben Crump Law of Tallahassee, Florida.

In 2020, Crump became the attorney for the families of Ahmaud Arbery, Breonna Taylor, George Floyd, and Jacob Blake. In 2021, he became the attorney for a passenger in the car with Winston Boogie Smith and for the family of Daunte Wright. Ongoing cases surrounding their killings or injuries led to protests against police brutality in America as well as internationally.

Due to his legal reputation, he has been referred to as "Black America's attorney general."

Early life and education
Benjamin Lloyd Crump was born in Lumberton, North Carolina, near Fort Bragg. The oldest of nine siblings and step-siblings, Crump grew up in an extended family and was raised by his grandmother. His mother, Helen, worked as a hotel maid and in a local Converse shoe factory. His mother sent him to attend South Plantation High School in Plantation, Florida, where he lived with her second husband, a math teacher, whom Crump regards as his father.

Crump attended Florida State University and received his bachelor's degree in criminal justice in 1992, and his Juris Doctor in 1995. He is a life member of the Omega Psi Phi fraternity.

Career

2002–2014: Early career, Martin and Brown cases
In 2002, Crump represented the family of Genie McMeans, Jr., an African American driver who died after being shot by a White state trooper. In 2007, Crump represented the family of Martin Lee Anderson, an African-American teenager who died after a beating in 2006 by guards in a Florida youth detention center.

In 2012, Crump began representing the family of Trayvon Martin, who was killed by George Zimmerman on February 26, 2012.

Crump also represented Ronald Weekley Jr., a 20-year-old African-American skateboarder beaten by police in Venice, California, in 2012.

Crump also represented the family of Alesia Thomas, a 35-year-old African-American woman who died while in police custody in August 2012. Journalist Chuck Philips reported that during the arrest by LAPD Officer Mary O’Callaghan, Thomas was "slammed to the ground, handcuffed behind her back, kicked in the groin, hog-tied and stuffed into the back seat of a patrol car, where she died." Crump demanded that dashboard video of the incident be released, threatening legal action and encouraging Attorney General Eric Holder to launch a federal probe. In October 2013, one of the arresting officers was charged with felony assault of Thomas, pleading not guilty. Judge Shelly Torrealba signed off on a request by the district attorney's office to only release the video to prosecutors and defense attorneys. This was to prevent the tainting of potential jury candidates, O'Callaghan's attorney Robert Rico said.

On August 11, 2014, the family of Michael Brown announced that they would be hiring Crump to represent their case, especially as the death had been widely compared to the Trayvon Martin case. Also in 2014, Crump was initially hired to represented the family of Tamir Rice, an African-American youth who was killed by police in Cleveland, Ohio, while holding a toy gun. Samaria Rice, the mother of Tamir Rice has criticized Crump and stated that she fired him 6-8 months into Tamir's case. One reason was that she felt it was questionable whether Benjamin Crump knew the laws in the state of Ohio.

2015–2019: Continued police brutality lawsuits

In 2015, Crump represented the family of Antonio Zambrano-Montes, an undocumented immigrant from Mexico who was killed by three policemen in Pasco, Washington. Also in 2015, he represented the family of Kendrick Johnson, an African-American high-school student who was found dead at his school in Valdosta, Georgia, under mysterious circumstances, but stepped down from their legal team in late 2015. In late 2015, Crump began representing the family of Corey Jones, who was killed by a plainclothes officer while waiting for a tow truck in South Florida.

In 2016, Crump began representing the family of Terence Crutcher, an unarmed black man shot and killed by a Tulsa police officer.

In 2017 Crump announced the opening of a new law firm, Ben Crump Law, PLLC.

In 2018, Crump represented the family of Zeke Upshaw in a wrongful death suit after Upshaw, an NBA G League player, collapsed midgame and was delayed assistance by the NBA's paramedics. Also in 2018 he became a Board Member for the National Black Justice Coalition.

In 2019, Crump partnered with law firm Pintas & Mullins to hold a number of rallies in Flint, Michigan for communities affected by the Flint water crisis. Also in 2019, Crump began representing a number of plaintiffs in a lawsuit against Johnson & Johnson alleging that the company's talc powder was directly related to said-plaintiffs' ovarian cancer diagnoses.

2020 cases
In early 2020, Crump began working with the family of Ahmaud Arbery, an unarmed 25-year-old African-American man murdered by two White civilians. Around this same time, the family of police shooting-victim Breonna Taylor, a 26-year-old African-American woman, retained Crump for the family's lawsuit alleging excessive force and gross negligence by the Louisville Metro Police Department.

In May 2020, Crump began representing the family of George Floyd, a 46-year-old unarmed African American who was murdered by Minneapolis Police Department officer Derek Chauvin, who knelt on Floyd's neck for over nine minutes. Chauvin was initially charged with third-degree murder and second-degree manslaughter; however, an additional second-degree murder charge was added 10 days later, and the three officers also present at the scene were subsequently charged with "aiding and abetting second-degree murder and aiding and abetting second-degree manslaughter." In April 2021, Chauvin was convicted on all three charges. In June 2020, Crump testified before the U.S. Senate Judiciary Committee about the George Floyd case and the discriminatory treatment of African Americans by the U.S. justice system.

In a two-day span in late August 2020, Crump was among counsel retained to represent the families of Trayford Pellerin, a 31-year-old African American man killed by police in Lafayette, Louisiana, and Jacob Blake, a 29-year-old African-American man shot at seven times (hit four times in the back) by a police officer in Kenosha, Wisconsin, while his children – aged three, five and eight – watched from the car. Crump retained Patrick A. Salvi Sr & Jr as co-counsel.

2021 cases 

In early 2021, Benjamin Crump began representing the family of nineteen-year-old Asian-American Christian Hall, who was shot and killed by Pennsylvania State Troopers in Monroe County. Hall was shot and killed in December 2020 on the overpass to Interstate 80 in Hamilton Township, after reports of a distraught man with a gun on the bridge. Troopers say at one point during negotiations, Hall became uncooperative and pointed the gun in the direction of officers. State Police fired, striking Hall. Attorneys for the family, including Crump, stated that a video circulating online shows a different story.

In April 2021, Crump began representing the family of Daunte Wright, a 20-year-old African American shot and killed by a Brooklyn Center Police Department officer. Former Brooklyn Center Police Chief Tim Gannon said that the officer intended to use her taser, but inadvertently drew her handgun. On December 23, 2021, a Hennepin County, Minnesota jury found the officer who shot him, Kimberly Potter, guilty of first-degree manslaughter and second-degree manslaughter.

In 2021, Crump and Christopher Seeger announced that they will be representing members of the family of Henrietta Lacks in a lawsuit against several pharmaceutical companies that have profited from the cell line HeLa, which is based on cervical cancer cells taken from Lacks without her knowledge in 1951.

Following the Astroworld Festival crowd crush, Crump is representing a concertgoer, Noah Gutierrez, in a lawsuit against Travis Scott. Crump said in a statement, “We are hearing horrific accounts of the terror and helplessness people experienced — the horror of a crushing crowd and the awful trauma of watching people die while trying unsuccessfully to save them."

In December 2021, Crump began representing the parents of 14-year-old girl who was fatally shot in a Los Angeles department store. A round aimed by L.A. Police Department response team at an assaulter ricocheted off the floor and passed through the wall of a dressing room where she and her mother had taken refuge, causing her death.

2022 cases 

In February 2022, Crump represented Amir Locke's family. Locke was shot and killed in January while police were executing a search warrant.

In April 2022, Crump took on the case of Patrick Lyoya of Grand Rapids, Michigan, who was killed by a police officer during a traffic stop.

In May 2022, Crump was retained by the families of Andre Mackneil, Geraldine Talley, and Ruth Whitfield, three victims of the 2022 Buffalo shooting on May 14.

In May 2022, Crump took on the case of Rwandan politician Paul Rusesabagina, sentenced to 25 years prison by the Rwandan government.

In July 2022, Crump was retained by the family of Andrew Tekle Sundberg, who was mortally wounded by police after he had fired into an apartment building.

In October 2022, Crump was retained by the family of Erik Cantu. The 17-year-old was shot by a San Antonio Police Department officer while eating a hamburger in his car at a McDonald's parking lot. In December 2022, Crump was hired by Emily Proulx, a passenger of Cantu's during the shooting.

2023 cases 

In January 2023, Crump began representing the family of Earl Moore Jr. in a wrongful death lawsuit against two Illinois paramedics, along with ambulance service company LifeStar. Moore died on December 18, 2022, as a result of asphyxiation after he was strapped face down to a stretcher while in medical distress. The paramedics, Peter Cadigan and Peggy Finley were charged with first-degree murder in January 2023.

Also in January of 2023, Crump announced he would represent the family of Tyre Nichols, who died on January 10, three days after a traffic stop, when five Memphis, Tennessee police officers tried to arrest Nichols for alleged reckless driving. During the incident, Nichols was beaten by the officers, and he was taken to the hospital after he reported he had shortness of breath. The case is ongoing.

In February 2023, Crump began representing the family of Malcolm X for a $100 million wrongful death lawsuit against the CIA, the FBI, the NYPD and others for allegedly concealing evidence related to the 1965 assassination of the civil rights leader and for alleged involvement to it.

Filmography 
In April 2017, Crump  appeared as himself on the American reality prime-time court show You the Jury. Later, in December 2017, Crump investigated the murder of Tupac Shakur in the television documentary series Who Killed Tupac? The show narrates an investigation led by Crump, who works with Tupac's brother, Mopreme Shakur. In 2018, Crump hosted a documentary television series on TV One called Evidence of Innocence. The show focused on people who served at least a decade behind bars after being wrongfully convicted of a crime. Crump hoped to "impact the larger society about these larger matters so they can be aware when they go into the courtroom as jurors".

On June 19, 2022, Netflix commemorated Juneteenth with the release of Civil: Ben Crump. A Netflix original, the documentary film is produced by Kenya Barris and directed by Nadia Hallgren.

Accolades 
In 2021, Crump was included on the Time 100, Times annual list of the 100 most influential people in the world. In 2023, St. Thomas University in Florida renamed their College of Law after Crump.

Daunte Wright 
On October 3, 2022, nearly 18 months after the April 11, 2021 police-involved fatal shooting of 20-year-old Daunte Demetrius Wright in Minneapolis, the Wright family and the office of Benjamin Crump were served a lawsuit by Chyna Whitaker, Wright's son's mother. Whitaker filed the suit, over GoFundMe proceeds she said were to go to her. A spokesperson for attorney Ben Crump told the press, "This is strictly a family dispute between the mother of Daunte Wright’s child and Daunte’s parents."

Whitaker filed the suit in Hennepin County, Minnesota.

Bibliography

 Crump, Benjamin L. "Ben Crump — the Man Who Represented the Families of Michael Brown, Trayvon Martin, and Tamir Rice — Will Not Stop Fighting for Justice." NowThis, June 24, 2018.
 Crump, Benjamin L. "Every Black Person Has Had A 'Starbucks Moment'". HuffPost, April 21, 2018.
 Crump, Benjamin L. "After Stephon Clark's Death, Shock and Mourning in Communities across the Nation." USA Today, March 29, 2018.
 Crump, Benjamin L. “Stand Your Ground Is a License to Kill. Repeal It.” Miami Herald, February 5, 2018.
 Crump, Benjamin L. “Libyan Slave Trade Perpetuates The Commodification of Black Bodies.” HuffPost, January 5, 2018.
 Crump, Benjamin L. "Civil Rights Resolutions for a Better America in 2018". CNN, January 2, 2018.
 Crump, Benjamin L. "The Unsolved Murder of Tupac Shakur Speaks To The Black Male's Experience Nationwide". HuffPost, December 12, 2017.
 Crump, Benjamin L. “Trump's Response To Charlottesville Was Far Too Little And Way Too Late.” HuffPost, August 15, 2017.
 Crump, Benjamin L. "Only A Just America Will Be A Truly Great America". HuffPost, January 15, 2017.
 Crump, Benjamin L. "Benjamin Crump: Seven Deaths Cannot Be In Vain". TIME, July 8, 2016.

References

External links
 
 
 
 
 

Living people
1969 births
20th-century African-American people
21st-century African-American people
African-American lawyers
American jurists
Baptists from North Carolina
Black Lives Matter
Florida lawyers
Florida State University College of Law alumni
People from Fort Lauderdale, Florida
People from Lumberton, North Carolina
Time (magazine) people